Kim Deok-hyeon ( or  ; born 8 December 1985 in Kwangju) is a South Korean triple jumper and long jumper.

He won bronze medals at the 2005 Asian Championships and the 2006 Asian Games, the gold medal at the 2007 Summer Universiade, the silver medal at the 2007 Asian Championships and finished ninth at the 2007 World Championships. He also competed at the 2006 World Indoor Championships without reaching the final.

International competitions

Personal best
Triple jump - 17.10 m (2009) 
Long jump - 8.20 m (2009)

References 

1985 births
Living people
South Korean male triple jumpers
South Korean male long jumpers
Olympic athletes of South Korea
Athletes (track and field) at the 2008 Summer Olympics
Athletes (track and field) at the 2012 Summer Olympics
Athletes (track and field) at the 2016 Summer Olympics
Asian Games gold medalists for South Korea
Asian Games silver medalists for South Korea
Asian Games bronze medalists for South Korea
Asian Games medalists in athletics (track and field)
Athletes (track and field) at the 2006 Asian Games
Athletes (track and field) at the 2010 Asian Games
Athletes (track and field) at the 2014 Asian Games
Athletes (track and field) at the 2018 Asian Games
World Athletics Championships athletes for South Korea
Medalists at the 2006 Asian Games
Medalists at the 2010 Asian Games
Medalists at the 2014 Asian Games
Universiade medalists in athletics (track and field)
Olympic male triple jumpers
Universiade gold medalists for South Korea
21st-century South Korean people